Shirley Cothran Barret (born September 18, 1952, Denton County, Texas) is an American beauty pageant titleholder from Texas.

Early life and education
She graduated from Denton High School in 1970 and was the second Miss America from that high school as Phyllis George was crowned Miss America before her in 1971. She later attended North Texas State University and earned her bachelor of science in elementary education and her master's degree in guidance counseling.

Cothran later used the scholarship money she earned from her Miss America win towards her Ph.D. in early childhood education and family counseling.

Life and career

She was crowned Miss Texas 1974 and won the Miss America 1975 title. She currently tours as a motivational speaker and still resides in Texas.

She appeared, with her husband and three sons, on the television game show Family Feud in the season 19 episodes 62 and 64.

Personal life
She married Richard Barret in 1976 and has four children, David, Julia, John, and Mark.

References

External links
Official website

Miss America winners
People from Fort Worth, Texas
American motivational speakers
Living people
1953 births
Miss America Preliminary Swimsuit winners
Miss America 1975 delegates